Thomas Yule (4 February 1888 – ?) was a Scottish footballer who played on the left-wing for Lincoln City, Wolverhampton Wanderers, and Port Vale in the 1910s.

Career
Yule played for Portobello before moving down to England to play for Lincoln City of the Second Division. He moved on to Wolverhampton Wanderers in 1911. Wolves finished fifth in the Second Division in 1911–12 and then tenth in 1912–13. In his two seasons at Molineux, Yule made a total of 33 appearances, scoring seven goals. He joined Port Vale in the summer of 1913. The "left-wing flyer" made his debut in a 3–3 draw with Blackburn Rovers Reserves in a Central League match at The Old Recreation Ground on 1 September 1913. He was a regular in the team and helped them reach the FA Cup first round in the 1913–14 season, which they lost 3–0 to Bolton Wanderers on 10 January 1914. Yule racked up a total of 20 goals in 77 appearances before departing the club in January 1915.

Career statistics
Source:

References

1888 births
Year of death missing
People from Douglas Water
Footballers from South Lanarkshire
Scottish footballers
Association football wingers
Lincoln City F.C. players
Wolverhampton Wanderers F.C. players
Port Vale F.C. players
English Football League players